Undone is the seventh in a series of collections of short stories by Australian author Paul Jennings. It was first released in 1993 and was the first book in the series not to have any short stories be adapted into an episode of Round the Twist.

The stories

Batty

Moonies
When an illiterate boy moves to a new school, the school bully has him sign a contract, which he does because he doesn't want anyone to know about his disability. Unfortunately, the contract means he has to moon his principal, ruining his chances of having his painting hung in the art gallery. However, the boy calls him a coward because the bully wouldn't moon and so he ends up doing it, but unfortunately for the bully, he gets into trouble.

Noseweed
A 95-year-old man enjoys cod-liver oil; his grandson does not. One day, while trying to breed a new species of apple in honour of his dead wife, his grandson comes over and is given his home-made muesli mixed with cod-liver oil in exchange for money for the movies. But since the grandson is unable to swallow it, the grandfather accompanies him to the movies. However, by leaving the oiled muesli in his mouth for too long, a plant grows on his face, which eventually produces the apple his grandfather wanted to invent.

Wake Up to Yourself
A boy is always picked last for sports teams. However, he is about to get a baby brother. While sleeping on the night just before his brother is born, he dreams about a world where he has a mate who helps him all the time; this mate turns out to be a grown-up version of his brother. In the dream he also finds that his mother has died and he lives with his grown up version of his little brother, who is called Simon but is nicknamed Possum. When the boy's baby brother is born his mother cleans him and admires the new born and says "What a lovely little possum". Possum also has a birth mark the shape of Australia just like the dream version of himself.

Thought Full
When a boy gets a new calf, his father wants to get rid of it, but the boy likes it so much, so he doesn't want that to happen. He eventually gets a bottle that, when drunk from, allows him to read people's minds.

This is  the only Paul Jennings short story that is told from a second-person point of view. This is because the boy wants the reader to experience how he felt.

Clear as Mud
When a new boy named Sammy Sams arrives at school, the school bully gives him a very hard time. But when the new boy discovers an unidentified species of beetle, he becomes respected by the school - with the exception of the bully, of course. So when the school tries to show the beetle to the authorities, the bully steals it and expresses a desire to pass it as his own discovery. However, he gets bitten; throughout the following day at school, his skin starts to become see-through. When it spreads to his entire body, he becomes a sideshow; embarrassed, he spends 10 years away from civilization. The bully decides to commemorate the tenth anniversary of his exile by eating the beetle; the beetle bites him again, and he kills it. Afterwards, the bully's skin returns to normal and he decides to return to society, only to discover that everyone else in the world has developed see-through skin.

What a Woman
The only girl at a 16-student school gets teased often by all the boys, for the dual reasons of being the only girl and being the worst of all of them in athletic venues. However, when she brings her dead aunt's good-luck charm to school, she suddenly becomes better than them.

You Be the Judge
A boy and his father live in the middle of the desert; despite the lack of customers at their tiny motel/petrol station, they believe that there will be even more because of a legend of a creature that lives in that area. One night, the boy goes out and spends several days wandering the desert, trying to find this legendary creature.

External links
 The book at Paul Jennings's site

Australian children's books
1993 short story collections
Books by Paul Jennings (Australian author)
Australian short story collections
BILBY Award-winning works
1993 children's books
Puffin Books books